Ayhan Akman (born 23 February 1977) is a retired Turkish footballer who last played for Galatasaray. He was suspended from football for six months after doping testing positive for a banned substance. He is the assistant manager of Galatasaray.

Club career
Akman played for İnegölspor, Gaziantepspor and Beşiktaş. 

He was suspended from football for six months after doping testing positive for banned for using banned Anabolik Steroid-Metenolone. His transfer from Gaziantepspor to Besiktas in 1998 for $8.75 million, as requested by manager John Toshack made Ayhan the most expensive internal transfer in Turkish football history, until recently.

Galatasaray

On 15 February 2012, he announced that he will retire at the end of the 2011–2012 season.

Retirement

Akman retired from his professional football career as of 13 May 2012.

International career
He was called up to Turkey's Euro 2008 squad and played his first match of the tournament in the semi-final against Germany in Basel.

Personal life
Akman is the uncle of the Turkish professional footballer Ali Akman.

Statistics

Club

International

Honours
Beşiktaş
Türkiye Kupası (1): 1997–98
Atatürk Kupası (1): 2000

Galatasaray
Süper Lig (4): 2001–02, 2005–06, 2007–08, 2011–12
Türkiye Kupası (1): 2004–05
Süper Kupa (1): 2007–08

Turkey
 UEFA European Championship bronze medalist: 2008

References

External links

 Profile at Galatasaray.org
 Statistics at TFF.org 
 
 
 
 
 

1977 births
Living people
People from İnegöl
Turkish footballers
İnegölspor footballers
Gaziantepspor footballers
Beşiktaş J.K. footballers
Galatasaray S.K. footballers
Süper Lig players
Turkey international footballers
Turkey under-21 international footballers
UEFA Euro 2000 players
UEFA Euro 2008 players
Doping cases in association football
Turkish sportspeople in doping cases
Turkey youth international footballers
Association football midfielders